Woodlands St Mary is a small village in the English county of Berkshire. The parish is within the unitary authority of West Berkshire, close to the border between the counties of Berkshire and Wiltshire.

Geography
Woodlands St Mary is located on the route of Ermin Way, the Roman road which connected Calleva Atrebatum (today's Silchester) to Glevum (Gloucester). The route of Ermin Way through the village is used by today's B4000 from Newbury to Lambourn.

Church
St Mary's church was built in 1851 and designed by the architect, Thomas Talbot Bury. It is a Grade II listed building.

See also
 List of places in Berkshire
 Berkshire Downs

References

External links

Villages in Berkshire
Lambourn